Jacques Derrida (1930–2004) was an Algerian-born French philosopher.

Derrida may also refer to:

 Bernard Derrida (born 1952), French theoretical physicist
 Marguerite Derrida (born Marguerite Aucouturier; 1932–2020), Czech-born French psychoanalyst, wife of Jacques
 Derrida (film), a 2002 American documentary film about Jacques Derrida